Wilczekra is a genus of flowering plants belonging to the family Celastraceae.

Its native range is Western Central Tropical Africa.

Species:
 Wilczekra congolensis (R.Wilczek) M.P.Simmons 
 Wilczekra gabonica Breteler

References

Celastraceae
Celastrales genera